Dragan Trajković (born 22 July 1997) is a Serbian football midfielder, who last played for Radnički Kragujevac.

Career

Radnički Kragujevac
He made his professional debut for Radnički Kragujevac in Serbian SuperLiga in home win against Spartak Subotica, played on 21 February 2015 at Čika Dača Stadium.

References

1997 births
Living people
Sportspeople from Kragujevac
Association football midfielders
Serbian footballers
FK Radnički 1923 players
Serbian First League players
Serbian SuperLiga players